Øksnevadporten Station or Øksnavadporten Station is a railway station located in Kvernaland in Klepp municipality in Rogaland county, Norway. The station is located on the Sørland Line. The station is served by the Jæren Commuter Rail between Stavanger and Egersund.

References

Railway stations on the Sørlandet Line
Railway stations in Rogaland
Railway stations opened in 1933
1933 establishments in Norway
Klepp